Porzhenka is a river,  long, within the Dvina–Pechora Watershed District in Russia. The river originates in the Bolshoye Porzhenskoye Lake and flows into Lake Kenozero, which is drained by the Kena towards the Onega. The Porzhensky Pogost is nearby.

References

Rivers of Arkhangelsk Oblast
Tributaries of the Onega